The Hong Kong cricket team toured Ireland in August and September 2016 to play two Twenty20 Internationals (T20Is) matches at Bready Cricket Club Ground, Magheramason as well as a first-class match at Stormont, Belfast.

The first-class match was part of the 2015–17 ICC Intercontinental Cup, with Ireland winning by 70 runs. Hong Kong won the T20I series 1–0, after a 40-run victory in the first match and the second match being abandoned without a ball being bowled.

Squads

Jacob Mulder was added to the squad as a replacement for Barry McCarthy, who was recalled back to Durham for the County Championship.

Intercontinental Cup

T20I series

1st T20I

2nd T20I

References

2016 in Hong Kong cricket
2016 in Irish cricket
International cricket competitions in 2016
Hong Kong cricket tours of Ireland